Martin Gerard James Neary LVO is an English organist and choral conductor.

Neary was born in London, and read theology and music at Cambridge University. He was Organist and Director of Music at Winchester Cathedral from 1972 to 1988, and Organist and Master of the Choristers at Westminster Abbey from 1988 to 1998. In 1984 he was Artist-in-Residence at the University of California at Davis.

The years at Winchester were especially innovative.  In addition to extending the traditional choral repertoire, Dr Neary commissioned new works from Jonathan Harvey and, in particular, John Tavener.

Overseas tours were made with the Cathedral choir, and in addition to his own organ recitals at the Cathedral he drew distinguished organists from across the world to play there, memorably including Daniel Chorzempa, Daniel Hathaway and Marilyn Keiser from USA, Raymond Daveluy from Montreal, Peter Planyavsky from Vienna and (among others) from the UK, Ralph Downes.  With his assistant organists James Lancelot and Timothy Byram-Wigfield he was responsible for planning of the major rebuilding and enlargement of the Cathedral organ by Harrison and Harrison in 1986–88.

As the organist at Westminster Abbey, he was the musical director of the funeral service for Diana, Princess of Wales, for which he was appointed a Lieutenant of the Royal Victorian Order (LVO) in the New Year Honours List in 1998. Neary's promotion of the music of John Tavener, the latter's "Song for Athene" was performed by the choir of the Abbey as the coffin was borne out by the pallbearers.

On 22 April 1998, Wesley Carr, the Dean of Westminster Abbey, dismissed Neary from his position at Westminster Abbey on the grounds of gross misconduct regarding the finances of a company that he and his wife had set up to administer fees from concerts at the Abbey.

Neary petitioned Queen Elizabeth II, as Visitor of the Abbey, to resolve the dispute. The Queen appointed Charles Jauncey, Baron Jauncey of Tullichettle, to be her Commissioner. Lord Jauncey determined that the summary dismissal was justified. The report also stated that Neary's well recognised musical abilities, and the hard work which he and his wife had done on behalf of the Abbey and the choir, were not in question.

His daughter, Alice Neary, cellist, won the 1998 Pierre Fournier Award at the Wigmore Hall.

References

English classical organists
British male organists
English conductors (music)
British male conductors (music)
Honorary Members of the Royal Academy of Music
Living people
Master of the Choristers at Westminster Abbey
21st-century British conductors (music)
21st-century organists
21st-century British male musicians
Male classical organists
Year of birth missing (living people)